Crookston Municipal Airport , also known as Kirkwood Field, is a city-owned public-use airport located four nautical miles (7 km) north of the central business district of Crookston, a city in Polk County, Minnesota, United States.

History
The airport provided contract glider training to the United States Army Air Forces from 1942 to 1944. Training was provided by L. Millar-Wittig. There was a turf 5,000' all-way airfield for landings and takeoffs. Using primarily C-47 Skytrains and Waco CG-4 non-powered gliders. The mission of the school was to train glider pilot students in proficiency of operation of gliders in various types of towed and soaring flight, both day and night, and in servicing of the gliders on the field.

Facilities and aircraft
It has three runways: 13/31 is 4,300 by 75 feet (1,311 x 23 m) with an asphalt surface; 17/35 is 2,977 by 202 feet (907 x 62 m) with a turf surface; 6/24 is 2,096 by 202 feet (639 x 62 m) with a turf surface.

For the 12-month period ending August 31, 2006, the airport had 20,150 aircraft operations, an average of 55 per day: 94% general aviation, 5% air taxi and less than 1% military. In March 2017, there were 36 aircraft based at this airport: all 36 single-engine.

See also

 Minnesota World War II Army Airfields
 29th Flying Training Wing (World War II)

References

Other sources
 
 Manning, Thomas A. (2005), History of Air Education and Training Command, 1942–2002. Office of History and Research, Headquarters, AETC, Randolph AFB, Texas 
 Shaw, Frederick J. (2004), Locating Air Force Base Sites, History’s Legacy, Air Force History and Museums Program, United States Air Force, Washington DC.

External links
 Crookston Municipal Airport (Kirkwood Field) at Minnesota DOT airport directory
 
 

1942 establishments in Minnesota
Airports established in 1942
USAAF Contract Flying School Airfields
USAAF Glider Training Airfields
Airfields of the United States Army Air Forces in Minnesota
Airports in Minnesota
Buildings and structures in Polk County, Minnesota
Transportation in Polk County, Minnesota